Pussylineus is a monotypic genus of nemerteans belonging to the family Lineidae. The only species is Pussylineus gabriellae.

References

Lineidae
Monotypic nemertea genera
Nemertea genera